Leroy Tate Marshall (November 8, 1883 – November 22, 1950) was an American lawyer and politician who served two terms as a U.S. Representative from Ohio from 1933 to 1937.

Biography 
Born on a farm near Bellbrook, Ohio, Marshall attended the public schools of Greene County, Ohio, where he was a teacher in the public schools from 1903 to 1907.
He graduated from Cedarville (Ohio) College in 1909 and moved to Xenia, Ohio, serving as clerk of courts, Greene County from 1909 to 1913. He studied law and was admitted to the Ohio bar in 1911, commencing the practicing of law in Xenia, Ohio. He served as chairman of the Greene County Republican county committee from 1920 to 1932, also serving as member of the Ohio State Senate from 1925 to 1928.

Congress 
Marshall was elected as a Republican to the Seventy-third and Seventy-fourth Congresses (March 4, 1933 – January 3, 1937). He was an unsuccessful candidate for reelection in 1936 to the Seventy-fifth Congress.

Later career and death 
He returned to Xenia to continue the practice of law until his death there, on November 22, 1950.

He was interred in Woodland Cemetery in Dayton.

He married Nellie Catherine Turnbull at Cedarville on June 4, 1908.

Sources

 

1883 births
1950 deaths
Politicians from Xenia, Ohio
Republican Party Ohio state senators
Cedarville University alumni
20th-century American politicians
Burials at Woodland Cemetery and Arboretum
Republican Party members of the United States House of Representatives from Ohio